Paul Timothy Haverson (born 19 February 1959) is an English former professional footballer who played in the Football League as a defender.

References

1959 births
Living people
People from Chigwell
English footballers
Association football defenders
Queens Park Rangers F.C. players
Wimbledon F.C. players
Kettering Town F.C. players
Enfield F.C. players
Tooting & Mitcham United F.C. players
Welling United F.C. players
English Football League players
National League (English football) players